Friday Night is a solo live album by American musician Will Butler, who is also a member of Arcade Fire. It contains live versions of many songs from his debut album Policy as well as five new songs and two of the songs that he recorded for The Guardian in a one-week song-a-day project. The album was released on June 17, 2016 by Merge Records.

Recording and concept 
Most of the songs for Friday Night were recorded at Lincoln Hall in Chicago on June 4, 2015.

The second track "Introduction" features the voice of comedian Jo Firestone. This played into Butler’s press release for the album, saying to "Think of this as a comedy record" because of the comedian’s presence, but also because "it’s an album based on working out ideas in a room full of people, playing off their energy and expectations. It’s about taking complicated emotions and wringing communal joy from them, and then translating that joy onto record".

The artwork was designed by Broad City star Abbi Jacobson.

Critical reception 

Writing for Exclaim!, Matt Bobkin praised the album’s "weird and ramshackle" feel.

Track listing

Personnel 
 Will Butler – guitar, vocals, keyboard
 Miles Arntzen – drums, backup vocals
 Julie Shore – synth bass, backup vocals
 Sara Dobbs – synth lead, synth pad backup vocals

References 

2016 live albums
William Butler (musician) albums
Merge Records albums